Prochoreutis diakonoffi is a moth of the family Choreutidae. It is known from Shaanxi, China and from Honshu, Japan.

References

External links
Japanese Moths

Prochoreutis
Moths of Japan